MDC may refer to:

Arts
Macau Design Centre, an art center in Macau
MDC (band) (Millions of Dead Cops), an American rock band
M.D.C. - Maschera di cera, a 1997 Italian horror film
Marinette Dupain-Cheng, the protagonist of Miraculous: Tales of Ladybug & Cat Noir

Chemistry and biology
Methylene dichloride, also known as dichloromethane (DCM)
Macrophage-derived chemokine (CCL22), a human cytokine
Metalloproteinase-like disintegrin-like cysteine-rich proteins, another name for the ADAM protein family
Biotin-independent malonate decarboxylase, an enzyme
Methylenedioxycathinone, a synthetic stimulant of the cathinone class
Myeloid dendritic cell, a subtype of the dendritic immune cell

Computing and electronics
MDC-600 and MDC-1200, an AFSK mobile data format used in Motorola two-way radios
Message digest code, cryptographic hash value
Metadata controller, which manages file locking, space allocation and data access authorization in a storage area network (SAN)
Mobile data computer
Mobile daughter card
Modification Detection Code
MDN Web Docs (formerly Mozilla Developer Center), a Mozilla website for developer documentation.
Multiple description coding, coding technique
Merkle–Damgård construction, a construction used by many hash functions
Mapped Diagnostic Context, a Log4j mechanism used to pass additional information to the underlying logger to provide better logging information on a per thread basis
Micro Data Center a containerized self-sufficient data center

Geography
Manado Airport, Indonesian airport
More developed country
Model dwellings company

Organizations
Mater Dei College, Tubigon, Bohol, Philippines
Max Delbrück Center for Molecular Medicine, Berlin
McDonnell Douglas, American aerospace manufacturing corporation which was acquired by Boeing in 1997
MDC Holdings, American home builder company
MDC Partners, an American advertising and marketing holding company
Medicaid Dental Center, chain of dental clinics in North Carolina
Metropolitan Detention Centers, US federal prisons
Metropolitan District Commission, defunct Massachusetts organization now part of the DCR
Metropolitan District Commission, Connecticut municipal corporation and utilities provider
Missouri Department of Conservation
Miami-Dade College, Miami, Florida
Movement for Democratic Change (pre-2005), a former Zimbabwean political party (split into MDC-T and MDC-N)
Movement for Democratic Change (2018), a Zimbabwean political party formed as a merger of parties that descended from the original MDC
Movement for Democratic Change – Tsvangirai (MDC-T), a Zimbabwean political party
Movement for Democratic Change – Ncube (MDC-N), a former Zimbabwean political party (merged into UMDC)
Movement for Democratic Change Alliance, an electoral bloc formed in Zimbabwe in 2017
MUMPS Development Committee, an organization that defines the MUMPS computer language and created the ANSI and ISO standards for MUMPS.
United Movement for Democratic Change, a Zimbabwean political party founded in 2014

Sports
Mon-Dak Conference, junior college conference in Montana and North Dakota
Miami Dolphins Cheerleaders, professional cheerleading squad of the Miami Dolphins
Michael Dal Colle, professional ice hockey winger for the New York Islanders of the National Hockey League

Other uses
1600 (number), a Roman numeral
Manuel de Codage, abbr. MdC, a system for transliterating ancient Egyptian hieroglyphs
Major Diagnostic Category, the groupings of the roughly 751 Medicare Severity Diagnosis Related Groups (MS-DRGs)